Jean de Boyssières (born 1555) was a French poet of the Renaissance.

Born at Clermont-Ferrand in 1555, Jean de Boyssières became a jurist. He dedicated most of his work to Francis, Duke of Anjou and Alençon.

Bibliography

 The second poetic works of J. of Boyssières, Paris, J. Poupy, 1568
 Regrets and lamentations of very high-Princess Ysabel of Austriche, on the decease of Lady Mary, daughter of France, by J. of Boyssières, Paris, C. Montreuil, 1578
 The Seconds poetic works, Paris, 1578
 The Estrille and drug quereleux pedantic or regent of the college of Clermont in Auvergne, formerly Jester Kidneys in Champaigne. Epigrames with all the poets of that time françois against him, In Lyon, Loys Cloquemin, 1579
 The Third of works by Jean Boyssières, Lyon, L. Cloquemin, 1579
 The first works dating: Monsieur, the Duc d'Anjou, son of Jean de France Boyssières, Montferrandin, Paris, C. Montreuil, 1578
 The Troisiesmes Works [part 4], Paris, 1579
 Ariosto francoes Jean de Boessières, with argumans and allegories on each song (Track: Epistle to Francoés and advertissemant, J. Bouchet), the first volume (I-XII songs.), Lyon, T. Ancelin, 1580
 The crusade of John Boissières, Esquire Sieur de la Boissiere in Auvergne. A Mr. Berterand, advisor & advocate general of the king in his room in Paris commptes, Paris, Peter Sevestre, 1584

References

External links
 Google Books
 Google Books
 preambule.net
 preambule.net
 holmi.org
 europeana.eu
 bnf.fr

1555 births
16th-century deaths
French poets
French male poets
Writers from Clermont-Ferrand